Westsyde Secondary School is a school in Kamloops, British Columbia, Canada.

References 

High schools in Kamloops
Educational institutions in Canada with year of establishment missing